Sparganothis niveana, the aproned cenopis moth, is a species of moth of the family Tortricidae. It is found in south-eastern Canada and the eastern part of the United States.

The wingspan is about 17 mm. The forewings are dark brown, except for a light yellow band across the base and the wingtip and a yellow semicircular patch. The hindwings are white. Adults are on wing from June to August.

References

Moths described in 1879
Sparganothis